Sübh is a village in the municipality of Birinci Mayak in the Neftchala Rayon of Azerbaijan.

References

Populated places in Neftchala District